Eureka Township is a township in Greenwood County, Kansas, United States.  As of the 2000 census its population was 451.

Geography
According to the USGS, it has a cemetery, Greenwood.

The streams of East Branch Fall River, Kitty Creek, Spring Creek and West Branch Fall River run through this township.

Transportation
Eureka Township contains one airport or landing strip, Eureka Municipal Airport.

References
 USGS Geographic Names Information System (GNIS)

External links
 City-Data.com

Townships in Greenwood County, Kansas
Townships in Kansas